Dorji Tshering is a Bhutanese politician who has been Minister for Works and Human Settlement since November 2018. He has been a member of the National Assembly of Bhutan, since October 2018.

Early life and education
Tshering was born .

He received a bachelor's degree in civil engineering from Indian Institute of Engineering Science and Technology, Shibpur (Howrah) India. He completed his master's degree in civil engineering from the Edith Cowan University, Australia.

Professional career
Before joining politics, he served as the executive engineer and deputy executive engineer in the Ministry of Works and Human Settlement for seven years.

Political career
Tshering is a member of Druk Nyamrup Tshogpa. He was elected to the National Assembly of Bhutan in the 2018 elections for the Radhi-Sakteng constituency. He received 3,550 votes and defeated Tashi Dorji, a candidate of Druk Phuensum Tshogpa.

On 3 November, Lotay Tshering formally announced his cabinet structure and Dorji Tshering was named as Minister for Works and Human Settlement. On 7 November 2018, he was sworn in as Minister for Works and Human Settlement in the cabinet of Prime Minister Lotay Tshering.

References 

1979 births
Living people
Bhutanese politicians
Bhutanese MNAs 2018–2023
Lotay Tshering ministry
Druk Nyamrup Tshogpa politicians
Edith Cowan University alumni
Druk Nyamrup Tshogpa MNAs